Sachin Yadav is an Indian politician and member of Indian National Congress. He is a two-time MLA from Kasrawad Constituency of Khargone District (M.P.) and a former cabinet minister in the Madhya Pradesh Government from 2018 to 2020. He is a son of the late Congress leader Shri Subhash Yadav, who was former Deputy Chief Minister of MP, and the brother of former Union Minister of State and Former MP Congress Chief Arun Yadav.

Career
He is a successful agriculturist, businessman, social worker, and politician.

Political career
He became MLA for the first time in 2013 after defeating Atmaram Patel from Kasrawad Seat. In 2018 Madhya Pradesh Legislative Assembly Elections, he once again defeated Atmaram Patel and became MLA from Kasrawad Seat.

On 25 December 2018 he took the oath as Cabinet Minister in the Madhya Pradesh Government headed by Shri Kamalnath.

He holds the Farmers Welfare and Agricultural Development Department, Department of Horticulture and Food Processing Department.

Political views
He supports Congress Party's ideology.

Personal life
He is married to Vinita Yadav.

See also
Madhya Pradesh Legislative Assembly
2013 Madhya Pradesh Legislative Assembly election
2008 Madhya Pradesh Legislative Assembly election

References

External links

Indian National Congress politicians from Madhya Pradesh
1980 births
Living people
Madhya Pradesh MLAs 2018–2023
Madhya Pradesh MLAs 2013–2018